Minggang railway station is a station on Beijing–Guangzhou railway in Minggang, Pingqiao District, Xinyang, Henan.

History
The station was established in 1903.

There is no regular scheduled passenger trains stop at this station after 2014, although ticket services remain at the station.

References

Railway stations in Henan
Stations on the Beijing–Guangzhou Railway
Railway stations in China opened in 1903